Pirili is a village and municipality in the Agstafa Rayon of Azerbaijan.  It has a population of 2,112.  The municipality consists of the villages of Pirili and Kolxəlfəli.

References 

Populated places in Aghstafa District